The Anbandidi Gospel is four Gospels from the 9th century. They are currently housed in the National Archives of Georgia, fond #1446, manuscript #107. They have 192 pages, are made of parchment. The dimensions are: 317x237; Asomtavruli; ink – brown, embellished initials – in certain cases with cinnabar. The text is rewritten in some parts; the manuscript is entirely written in Asomtavruli, in two columns; upper borders are cut and the traces of upper quire pagination are lost; ruling lines and dots are very visible.

The manuscript has partially retained its cover panels; traces of older – leather locks are discernible; wooden pegs for fixing leather are preserved.

Due to the extremely large size of the graphemes, the manuscript is known as the Anbandidi (with big alphabet) Gospel in academic circles. The Anbandidi Gospel is one of the several oldest Georgian manuscripts; it is distinguished by its simplicity, exquisiteness, oldness, text version, material and spiritual values. The decoration of the text is formed in a strictly arranged frame, Calvary Cross embedded in the text (96r), decorated initials embellished with cinnabar, accentuated endings.

The Anbandidi Gospel is one of those rare manuscripts containing four Gospels [Opisa (913), Jruchi (936), Parkhali (973), of Tevdore (10th c.) and Gabriel Patarai (10th c.), which are entirely written in Asomtavruli. The hardened, stained, but still well preserved parchment manuscript bears the traces of travel within quite a vast geographical area. The Gospel is a valuable part of our intellectual treasury, occupying one of the significant places in the study of the history of manuscripts.

The manuscript is supplied with 17th-18th cc. records, while a large synodicon, which is ascribable to the late Middle Ages and is still unstudied, is attached at the end.

The Anbandidi Gospel is an achievement of world culture, representing a most important stage in the development of manuscripts. Greatest is its role in the history of translation and development of decorative

elements.

In 2015 Anbandidi Gospel was inscribed to UNESCO Memory of the World Register.

Literature 
 The UNESCO Memory of the World Register. The Manuscripts Preserved in the National Archives of Georgia. Editor/compiler Ketevan Asatiani. Tbilisi. 2016
 Illuminated Georgian Manuscripts and Historical Documents. Editor/compiler Ketevan Asatiani. Tbilisi. 2016
 Anbandidi 9th century manuscript Four Gospels, text prepared for publishing by Manana Machkhaneli, 2010

Internet resources 

http://www.unesco.org/new/en/communication-and-information/memory-of-the-world/register/full-list-of-registered-heritage/registered-heritage-page-8/the-oldest-manuscripts-preserved-at-the-national-archives-of-georgia/

9th-century biblical manuscripts
Apocryphal Gospels
Georgian manuscripts
9th-century illuminated manuscripts